Ludwig van Beethoven's Cantata on the Death of Emperor Joseph II, WoO 87 is a cantata with a libretto by Severin Anton Averdonk (1768-1817), written in 1790 and intended for a memorial service for Joseph II, Holy Roman Emperor to be held in Bonn.
Composed when Beethoven was nineteen, it was neither published, nor apparently performed until it premiered in Vienna in November 1884, fifty-seven years after Beethoven's death, and it was first printed in an 1888 supplement to the Complete Works. It remains one of Beethoven's lesser-known works.

Structure 
The cantata, written in C minor, has seven movements.

 Coro. Largo - Larghetto (C minor)
 Recitativo. Presto (A minor)
 Aria. Allegro maestoso - Allegro assai (D major)
 Aria con Coro. Andante con moto (F major)
 Recitativo. Largo (D minor)
 Aria. Adagio con affetto (E♭ major)
 Coro. Largo - Larghetto (C minor)

Composition 
The work is scored for 2 flutes, 2 oboes, 2 clarinets, 2 bassoons, 2 horns, strings and SATB chorus with solo soprano and bass (there is also a solo semichorus SSATB). The seven movements take approximately 35 minutes to perform.

See also 
 Beethoven and C minor

External links 

The libretto by Severin Anton Averdonk, on the German Wikipedia page.

Compositions by Ludwig van Beethoven
1790 compositions
Joseph II, Holy Roman Emperor